Greenbank Park is a public park in Liverpool, England, with the middle of the park dominated by a small lake. It is situated in the suburb of Mossley Hill in the south of the city, close to Penny Lane and Sefton Park.

Historical background
The area was the former home of the Rathbone family, philanthropists through two centuries. The family acquired nearby Greenbank House in 1788 as a holiday house and remained there until 1940. Gradually it became their permanent residence and a venue for many distinguished visitors to Liverpool who "had some special opinion to propagate or philanthropic scheme to advance".

In 1897 Liverpool Corporation entered into an agreement with the Rathbone family to purchase the piece of land, part of which is now Greenbank Park for the sum of £13,000. The agreement required the corporation to maintain this land as open space or recreation ground for the general public, "but they shall be at liberty to let off the whole or any part of the said land to cricket or other clubs, and to use the lake for boating, skating or other purposes".

In case the corporation was to develop the land, they were charged with maintaining a roadway or pathway to allow public access to the lake and to prevent as far as possible the destruction of trees. The park boasts the dual distinction of having the first of the old English gardens in Liverpool's parks, and the first boating lake. The walled garden is all that remains of the Rathbone estate on the park. Now laid out as an old English garden, it contains a memorial tablet to the late Mr. Michael Kearney, the former Deputy Chairman of the Parks and Gardens Committee, who originated the idea of its design. This garden, once famous for its herbaceous borders, has been restored in a move to reflect its former glory.

Current usage
Greenbank Park has a children's playground, football, pitches, and a fishing pond, as well as mature trees and a conservation area. The pond provides the focal point within the park. Visitors are able to fish and can watch nesting waterfowl and herons. There is a bridge at the northern end of the pond. The wet area towards this end is used as a conservation area and it has been proposed that following improvement works with local schools, this will become an outdoor classroom. Much of the area is open parkland with trees to the perimeter. The wall to the side of the children's playground is a colourful result of a local graffiti art project.

References
Liverpool City Council official page on Greenbank Park

Parks and commons in Liverpool